Vassos Melanarkitis (born August 11, 1972) is a Cypriot former international football defender.

He played for only two teams, Anorthosis Famagusta and Apollon Limassol.

External links
 

1972 births
Living people
Anorthosis Famagusta F.C. players
Apollon Limassol FC players
Cypriot footballers
Cyprus international footballers
Greek Cypriot people
Association football defenders